Daniel Spencer may refer to:

 Daniel Spencer (Mormon) (1794–1868), mayor of Nauvoo, Illinois and Mormon pioneer
 Daniel Spencer (environmentalist), South Australian climate activist
 Danny Spencer, guitarist with Rogue Traders
 Dan Spencer (born 1965), American baseball coach

See also
 Danielle Spencer (disambiguation)